John Lancaster Spalding (June 2, 1840 – August 25, 1916) was an American author, poet, advocate for higher education, the first bishop of the Roman Catholic Diocese of Peoria from 1877 to 1908 and a co-founder of The Catholic University of America.

Biography

Early years 
John Spalding was born on June 2, 1840, in Lebanon, Kentucky. He graduated in 1856 from St. Mary's College in St. Mary's, Kentucky, which had been founded by William Byrne and George Elder. The Spaldings and the Elders were related by marriage, Thomas Elder having married Elizabeth Spalding. Elizabeth was the paternal aunt of Catherine Spalding, co-founder of the Sisters of Charity of Nazareth. Thomas and Elizabeth were the grandparents of William Henry Elder, Archbishop of Cincinnati.

John Spalding attended Mt. St. Mary College in Emmitsburg, Maryland briefly, before graduating in 1859 from Mount St. Mary's Seminary of the West in Cincinnati.  His uncle, Martin Spalding, was bishop of Louisville, and arranged for him to attend the American College of the Immaculate Conception in Louvain, Belgium.

Priesthood 
Spalding was ordained to the priesthood for the Archdiocese of Louisville in Belgium by Archbishop Engelbert Streckx on December 19, 1863  After his ordination, Spalding  continued his studies as the Belgian Pontifical College in Rome. He returned to Louisville in 1865 to become assistant pastor of the Cathedral of the Assumption. In 1866, Spalding attended the Second Plenary Council of Baltimore as theologian to Archbishop François Blanchet from the Archdiocese of Oregon City in Oregon.

In 1872, Spalding travelled to New York to write a biography of his late uncle, Martin Spalding, and became assistant pastor of the Church of St. Michael Parish in Manhattan.

Bishop of Peoria 
On November 11, 1876, Pope Pius IX appointed Spalding as bishop of the Diocese of Peoria, newly created out of the Diocese of Chicago. He was installed on May 23, 1877,by Cardinal John McCloskey, with Coadjutor Bishop Thomas Foley presiding.

Spalding was instrumental in the founding of the Catholic University of America in Washington, D.C., as well as several Catholic schools in Peoria. He also oversaw the construction of St. Mary's Cemetery in West Peoria, Illinois.

In 1876, six Sisters of the Third Order of St. Francis, at the request of Reverend Bernard Baak, pastor of St. Joseph, arrived from Iowa City to care for the sick. They served at the city hospital and made home visits. Shortly after their arrival, Spalding visited the hospital and observing the difficult conditions the sisters worked under, encouraged them to form a separate congregation with his support. As the mother superior had no objections, the Sisters of the Third Order of St. Francis of Peoria was established in July 1877. St. Francis Hospital opened in Peoria 1878..

Spalding achieved national prominence for helping President Theodore Roosevelt and banker J. P. Morgan to end the Great Coal Strike of 1902 as a member of the Arbitration Commission that awarded the miners a retroactive 10% wage increase and reduced daily work hours from 10 to 9.

Spalding wrote several books and poetry under the pseudonym Henry Hamilton.

The Third Plenary Council of Baltimore of 1884 authorized a commission be established to create a uniform catechism. Spalding and Monsignor Januarius de Concilio of Seton Hall University prepared a draft and distributed it to the bishops, who were to forward their revisions to Spalding, who would, in turn, report back at the next meeting. Anticipating long and fruitless discussion, Spalding dispensed with procedure and sent the draft to Archbishop James Gibbons, indicating that he had made suggested changes where appropriate. Cardinal John McCloskey of New York gave it the imprimatur, Gibbons approved the text, and it was published in April 1885. Though not universally applauded, the Baltimore Catechism remained the standard catechism in the United States for the next eighty years.

Spalding was awarded an honorary degree from Columbia University in 1902, and from Western Reserve University in 1904.

Retirement and legacy 
Spalding became paralyzed from a stroke in 1905. Pope Pius X accepted his resignation as bishop of the Diocese of Peoria on September 11, 1908 due to poor health and appointed him Titular Bishop of Scythopolis. John Spalding died on August 25, 1916 at age 76.

The diocesan offices of the Diocese of Peoria are located in the Spalding Center, named for him. Peoria's Catholic high school for boys, Spalding Institute, was named for him. Spalding Hall at The Catholic University of America was also named for him.

Caldwell sisters
William Shakespeare Caldwell, a wealthy Kentucky gas baron,  was married to Mary Eliza Breckinridge of the Kentucky Breckinridges. Although Protestant, Mary Eliza had attended Nazareth Academy founded by the Sisters of Charity of Nazareth, and was subsequently baptized Catholic by Bishop Spalding of Louisville. When Mrs. Caldwell died unexpectedly in 1867, "Shake" sought solace in his wife's religion. He founded Sts. Mary and Elizabeth Hospital in Louisville, run by the Sisters of Charity, in her memory; and a home for indigent men in Richmond, operated by the Little Sisters of the Poor. Caldwell moved to New York and enrolled his two daughters, Mary Guendaline and Mary Elizabeth in the Academy of the Sacred Heart on 17th Street. Caldwell died in 1874. Under the terms of his will, he subsidized ten places in the Richmond home for poor individuals of Fredericksburg; He also stipulated that upon reaching the age of twenty-one, his daughters were to donate one-third of their substantial inheritance to establish a Catholic university.

When Mary Guendaline was 21, she gave the money to buy the land for Catholic University and to build Caldwell Hall, which was named after her. Mary Elizabeth funded Caldwell Hall's chapel. Mary Elizabeth married Baron Moritz Curt von Zedtwitz (1851-1896), German Minister to Mexico, and converted to Lutheranism. The sisters travelled extensively in Europe. In 1896, Mary Guendaline married the middle-aged François Jean Louis, Marquis de Montiers-Mérinville in Paris. Bishop John Spalding of Peoria performed the ceremony. In 1904, the sisters broke with the Catholic Church, the Marquise stating that her "honest Protestant blood had asserted itself". She requested that her portrait in Caldwell Hall be removed. According to the New York Times, her actions provoked little surprise as she was in poor health having suffered a stroke two years earlier and "[t]he Marquise is an original character and extremely impulsive." The Marquise separated from her husband in 1905, but paid him an annual stipend of $8,000 in order to keep her title.

In 1906, Mary Elizabeth's book, The Double Doctrine of Rome, in which she takes issue with "Popery", its beliefs, and practices, was published. That same year she sent a letter to The Converted Catholic, stating that Spalding was never their guardian, nor had her parents ever met him.

Spalding was later accused of having an affair with both sisters though the allegation was questionable. The potential for scandal cost Spalding appointment to the See of Chicago and he remained Bishop of Peoria. "[T]here is general consensus that the sisters’ stories about Spalding bore little relation to the facts, that their tragic marriages and psychic illnesses, plus Spalding's unwillingness to arrange an annulment for Mary Elizabeth, contributed to their turning against the church."

Publications

 Essays and Reviews
 Lectures and Discourses
 Education and the Higher Life
 The Poet's Praise (as Henry Hamilton)
 Opportunity and Other Essays (as Henry Hamilton)
 Aphorisms and Reflections
 Socialism and Labor
 Brilliants, From the Writings of Rt. Rev. J. L. Spalding, D.D.

Legacy
The Diocese of Peoria has established the John Lancaster Spalding Scholarship, a tuition assistance program for students in any parish to attend any Catholic school in the diocese.

References

Further reading
 Curti, Merle. The Social Ideas of American Educators (1935) pp 348–73
 Sweeney, David Francis. The Life of John Lancaster Spalding: First Bishop of Peoria, 1840-1916 (Vol. 1. Herder and Herder, 1966)

External links

 
 
 
 Loyola Marymount University: Digital Commons @ LMU and LLS: Catholic Education: A Journal of Inquiry and Practice: July 2013 issue: "John Lancaster Spalding (1840-1916): A Catalyst for Social Reform"
 Biola University: Talbot School of Theology: John Lancaster Spalding
 The Sisters of the Third Order of St. Francis: Archbishop John Lancaster Spalding
 

1840 births
1916 deaths
American biographers
American College of the Immaculate Conception alumni
American education writers
American male essayists
American male poets
American religious writers
20th-century Roman Catholic bishops in the United States
Catholic University of America people
Catholic University of Leuven (1834–1968) alumni
People from Lebanon, Kentucky
Poets from Illinois
Poets from Kentucky
Roman Catholic bishops of Peoria
Writers from Peoria, Illinois
Catholics from Kentucky
Historians from Illinois
19th-century Roman Catholic bishops in the United States
American male biographers